Calamagrostis villosa is a species of flowering plant from the family Poaceae which is native to Europe.

Description
The panicle is open, inflorescenced, and linear. They carry one fertile floret which have a bearded floret callus.

The species also have glumes which are lanceolate, membranous, and have acuminate apexes with the upper glume being of the same size as a spikelet. Flowers have two lodicules and two stigmas along with and three stamens. The fruits are caryopses with additional pericarp and punctiform hilum.

References

villosa
Flora of Europe